The 2023 Auburn Tigers football team represent Auburn University in the 2023 NCAA Division I FBS football season. The Tigers are led by first-year head coach Hugh Freeze. And compete as members of the West Division of the Southeastern Conference (SEC). They will play their home games at Jordan-Hare Stadium in Auburn, Alabama.

Previous season 
The Tigers finished the 2022 season 5–7, 2–6 in SEC play to finish in sixth place in the West division. On October 31, 2022, the school fired head coach Bryan Harsin, who was in his second season as head coach. Running backs coach Carnell "Cadillac" Williams assumed interim head coaching duties after the dismissal of Harsin. On November 28, the school named Liberty coach Hugh Freeze the team's new head coach.

Offseason

2023 NFL draft

Transfers 
Outgoing

Incoming

Personnel

Coaching Staff

Schedule
Auburn and the SEC announced the 2023 football schedule on September 20, 2022. The 2023 Tigers' schedule consists of 7 home games and 5 away games for the regular season. Auburn will host four SEC conference opponents Alabama (Iron Bowl), Georgia (Deep South's Oldest Rivalry), Mississippi State and Ole Miss (rivalry) at home and will travel to four SEC opponents, Arkansas, LSU (rivalry), Texas A&M and Vanderbilt to close out the SEC regular season on the road. Auburn is not scheduled to play SEC East opponents Florida, Kentucky, Missouri, South Carolina and Tennessee in the 2023 regular season. The Tigers' bye week comes during week 6 (on October 7, 2023).

Auburn out of conference opponents represent the CUSA, Pac-12, SoCon conferences and one FBS independent school. The Tigers will host three of the four non–conference games which are against New Mexico State from CUSA, UMass an FBS independent program and Samford from the SoCon. The Tigers will travel to California from the Pac-12.

References

Auburn
Auburn Tigers football seasons
Auburn Tigers football